Riverview Plantation is a historic home located near Williamsburg, James City County, Virginia. The house dates to the 1850s, and consists of a 3-story, five bay, center section flanked by -story end additions of 1913–1914.  It has a gable roof with dormers.  The interior of the frame dwelling features Federal and Greek Revival design details.   Also on the property are a contributing smokehouse (c. 1942), tenant house (c. 1942), and the site of 1850s orchard terraces.

It was listed on the National Register of Historic Places in 1996.

The upper rooms of the home, with their view of the York River, feature drawings on the walls of various sea life, including a whale. Traditionally, after snowfall, the orchard terraces are now utilized as sled runs by neighbors.

References

Houses on the National Register of Historic Places in Virginia
Houses completed in 1850
Federal architecture in Virginia
Greek Revival houses in Virginia
Houses in James City County, Virginia
National Register of Historic Places in James City County, Virginia
1850s establishments in Virginia